God's Comedy is a 1995 Portuguese film by João César Monteiro. It is the second part in a trilogy, preceded by Recordações da Casa Amarela (1989) (Recollections of the Yellow House) and followed by As Bodas de Deus (1999) (Houses of God). God is symbolized through the character João de Deus (lit.: John of God), played by writer/director Monteiro himself. The film was submitted as the Portuguese entry for the Best Foreign Language Film at the 68th Academy Awards, but did not earn a nomination.

See also
 List of submissions to the 68th Academy Awards for Best Foreign Language Film
 List of Portuguese submissions for the Academy Award for Best Foreign Language Film

References

External links
 

1995 films
1995 drama films
Films directed by João César Monteiro
Venice Grand Jury Prize winners
1996 drama films
1996 films
Portuguese drama films
1990s Portuguese-language films